Gravermarka is a small village in Vågan Municipality in Nordland county, Norway. It is located on the western side of the island of Austvågøya in the Lofoten archipelago.

Gravermarka has a population of about 60 inhabitants. The village has been a documented settlement since the 1600s, but it probably goes back to the Viking Age. Three Viking graves have been found in the village. There are two farms and a local shop in the village. There has been plans to restore the local fishery that has been out of business for 20 years for some sort of industry. The majority of the population work in the nearby town of Svolvær.

Population

References

Villages in Nordland
Vågan
Populated places of Arctic Norway
Viking Age populated places